The 2001 William Hill Greyhound Derby Final took place during May and June with the final being held on 2 June 2001 at Wimbledon Stadium.  The winner received £75,000. Rapid Ranger successfully defended his title and became only the third greyhound in history to win the Derby twice, he was owned by Ray White and bred by Martin Broughan. Two of the finalists Smoking Bullet and Countrywide Tams were owned by Vinnie Jones.

Final result 
At Wimbledon (over 480 metres):

Distances 
3¼, 1½, head, 3½, head (lengths)
The distances between the greyhounds are in finishing order and shown in lengths. One length is equal to 0.08 of one second.

Final Report
Rapid Ranger soon led and won comfortably from the strong finishing Scottish Derby champion Sonic Flight who had found trouble at the first bend along with Smoking Bullet and Droopys Honcho. Castlelyons Dani finished well for third after crowding and Countrywide Tams had a clear run.

Quarter finals

Semi finals

See also
2001 UK & Ireland Greyhound Racing Year

References

Greyhound Derby
English Greyhound Derby